This is a list of houses, commercial buildings, educational facilities, furniture designs, and other structures designed by architect Eero Saarinen. Many of Saarinen's early designs were in collaboration with his father Eliel Saarinen.

List of works

References
 

Saarinen, Eero